Someone To Drive You Home is the debut album by The Long Blondes. It was released on November 6, 2006. It received widespread critical praise and was placed 7th in the NME'''s best 50 albums of 2006 list  and features in many other best of lists for 2006.

The predominant theme of the album is relationships from a female perspective, although 10 of the tracks on the album were written by male guitarist Dorian Cox. Themes dealt with include competition between females, isolation, sexual exploration and deceit. Influences of Pulp, Elastica, Morrissey and Blondie have been frequently quoted when the album is discussed in the media.

The title of the album comes from a line in the song "You Could Have Both".

The album's artwork is a painting by lead singer Kate Jackson; it is an image of Faye Dunaway in the film Bonnie and Clyde'', with a Mark 3 Ford Cortina as her getaway car.
The artwork inside the album sleeve is a painting of Nicolas Cage & Laura Dern in the film Wild At Heart.

Track listing
"Lust in the Movies" – 3:05
"Once And Never Again" – 2:56
"Only Lovers Left Alive" – 3:59
"Giddy Stratospheres" – 5:08
"In the Company of Women" – 2:39
"Heaven Help the New Girl" – 3:54
"Separated by Motorways" – 2:19
"You Could Have Both" – 4:47
"Swallow Tattoo" – 2:31
"Weekend Without Makeup" – 4:11
"Madame Ray" – 3:30
"A Knife for the Girls" – 5:08

US bonus disc
"Fulwood Babylon" – 4:05
"Five Ways to End It" – 6:06
"Never to Be Repeated" – 3:43
"All Bar One Girls" – 4:09

15th Anniversary Edition Disc 2
"Five Ways To End It" - 6:06
"Fulwood Babylon" – 4:05
"The Whippet Fancier" - 3:46
"Who Are You To Her?" - 4:29
"Never To Be Repeated" – 3:43
"All Bar One Girls" – 4:09
"I'm Coping" - 3:13
"Last Night On Northgate St" - 2:54
"Platitudes" - 3:18
"Melville Farr" - 1:37
"The Unbearable Lightness Of Buildings" - 5:42

Personnel

The Long Blondes 
 Emma Chaplin: guitars, keyboards, vocals
 Dorian Cox: guitars, keyboards, vocals, lyrics except on tracks 7 and 11
 Reenie Hollis: bass guitar, vocals
 Kate Jackson: lead vocals, lyrics on tracks 7 and 11, artwork
 Screech Louder: drums

Other 
 Produced and mixed by: Steve Mackey and Richard Flack
 Assistant engineers: Ben Mason, Serge Krebs
 Mastered by: Guy Davie at the Exchange
 Logo by: Matt Bolton
 Layout by: Jeff Teader

External links

 Someone to Drive You Home Album Review at UKEvents.net

References 

2006 debut albums
The Long Blondes albums
Rough Trade Records albums
Albums produced by Steve Mackey